Ziminella japonica is a species of sea slug, an aeolid nudibranch, a marine heterobranch mollusc in the family Paracoryphellidae.

Description

Distribution
This species is widely distributed throughout British Columbia, Alaska, Japan, Siberia and Atlantic Canada to Massachusetts.

References

Paracoryphellidae
Gastropods described in 1937